Jhilimili Coalfield is located in Surguja district in the Indian state of Chhattisgarh.

Geography
Jhilimili Coalfield is a part of Central India Coalfields. The latter is spread over the districts of Surguja, Koriya (both in Chhattisgarh), Shahdol and Umaria (both in Madhya Pradesh). There are fourteen coalfields in this group: Korar, Umaria, Johilla, Sohagpur, Sonhat, Jhilimili, Chirimiri, Sendurgarh, Koreagarh, Damhamunda, Panchbahini, Hasdeo-Arand, Lakhanpur and Bishrampur. The deposits are at a depth of 0–1200 meters. Therefore, extraction is mainly amenable to underground mining except a few blocks in eastern part of these coalfields which have opencast potential.

Estimated total reserves are 215.31 million tonnes, out of which about half have been indicated to be Grade I. According to the Geological Survey of India, total reserves of non-coking coal (as of 1 January 2004) in Jhilimili Coalfield (up to a depth of 300m) was 267.10 million tonnes.

References

Coalfields of India
Energy in Chhattisgarh
Surguja district
Mining in Chhattisgarh